Stanislav (Stane) Zore, O.F.M. (born 7 September 1958), is the Archbishop of the Roman Catholic Archdiocese of Ljubljana and the metropolitan bishop of Ljubljana as well as the president of the Slovenian Bishops' Conference. 

As the Archbishop of Ljubljana he was also the Grand Chancellor of the Faculty of Theology of the University of Ljubljana.

References

External links

  Katoliska-cerkev.si - Ljubljanski nadškof metropolit msgr. Stanislav Zore
 Catholic-hierarchy.org - Archbishop Stanislav (Stane) Zore, O.F.M.

1958 births
Living people
People from the Municipality of Kamnik
Slovenian Friars Minor
Franciscan bishops
University of Ljubljana alumni
Roman Catholic archbishops of Ljubljana
20th-century Roman Catholic bishops in Slovenia
21st-century Roman Catholic archbishops in Slovenia
20th-century Slovenian Roman Catholic priests